Walcot is a small village in the borough of Telford and Wrekin and ceremonial county of Shropshire, England.

The village is situated equidistant between Shrewsbury and Wellington. Surrounding villages include Allscott, Withington, and Wrockwardine; Walcot forms part of the parish of Wrockwardine.

Walcot Bridge (Graded II Listed)

Designed by William Hayward (circa 1740–1782). Road bridge over the River Tern, not far from the confluence of the River Roden. Ashlar with 3 rusticated round-arches with keyblocks. Cutwaters have semi-circular section 'pilasters' above in the spandrels. String course and low parapet with panel at centre inscribed with date MDCCLXXXII (Roman for year 1782) and inscription "the last Edifice erected by that ingenious Architect William Hayward". The abutments splay outwards and are terminated with square piers. William Hayward also designed the bridge over the River Tern at Atcham, Shropshire and the bridge over the Thames at Henley, Oxfordshire in 1781.

Walcot Hall, named after the Walcot family, is in the village of Lydbury North, 40 km (25 miles) south-west of Shrewsbury.

See also
Listed buildings in Wrockwardine

External links

The 'Walcot Mannequin Mystery' website

Villages in Shropshire
Telford and Wrekin